Reginald Williams, Jr. (born May 17, 1983) is a former American football wide receiver in the National Football League (NFL). Williams played college football for the University of Washington, and earned consensus All-American honors. He was drafted by the Jacksonville Jaguars in the first round of the 2004 NFL Draft, and played five seasons for the team.

Early years
Williams was born in Landstuhl, West Germany.  He attended Lakes High School in Lakewood, Washington.  He led his Lakes Lancer high school football team to the championship game in his senior year and was the Associated Press Washington State Player of the Year.

College career
Williams attended the University of Washington, and played for the Washington Huskies football team from 2001 to 2003.  He was a first-team All-Pac-10 selection in 2002 and 2003, and was recognized as a consensus first-team All-American in 2002.

Professional career

Jacksonville Jaguars
Williams was drafted 9th overall in the 2004 NFL Draft by the Jacksonville Jaguars. He was the third receiver taken behind Larry Fitzgerald (3rd overall) and Roy Williams (7th overall).

Williams put up disappointing numbers in his rookie season of 2004. He rebounded the first half of 2005, but in the second half, he had a slump brought on by a concussion.

Through the first six weeks of the 2006 season, Williams was among the top receivers in the NFL. An ankle injury caused Byron Leftwich to miss the remainder of the season. After David Garrard became the starting quarterback, Williams' production slipped.

Williams had his best game as a pro against the New Orleans Saints in Week 9 of the 2007 season, making six catches for 128 yards and one touchdown. His best professional season to date was in 2007, where he had 38 catches for 629 yards (an average of 16.6 yards per catch) and 10 touchdowns (more than twice his career total prior to 2007). In a game against the Oakland Raiders in Week 16, he broke the Jaguars' single season receiving touchdown record, with ten scores, record previously held by the retired Jimmy Smith.

Seattle Seahawks
After spending the 2009 season out of football, Williams signed with the Seattle Seahawks on April 16, 2010. He was released from the Seattle Seahawks on June 18, 2010.

Sacramento Mountain Lions
On July 7, 2011, he signed with the Sacramento Mountain Lions. On September 18, 2011, he made his season debut against the Las Vegas Locomotives. He had his first receiving touchdown in the 3rd quarter in that game. On October 4, 2011, he was released by the team.

Toronto Argonauts
On May 29, 2013, Williams was signed by the Toronto Argonauts of the CFL. Williams played in both the 2013 CFL season preseason games for the Argos. In those games he caught 4 passes for 42 yards and a touchdown. On June 22, 2013 Williams was released by the Toronto Argonauts.

NFL statistics
Receiving statistics 

Rushing statistics

Personal life
Williams was arrested in January 2006 and charged with possession of marijuana; he was permitted to enter a pretrial intervention program, which he successfully completed. He was arrested again and charged with DWI and possession of marijuana on February 27, 2009 in Houston, Texas; both charges were later dismissed. On April 5, 2009, police officials reported Williams was arrested on felony drug charges after scuffling with Houston police officers at a local night club. Police tasered Williams and took him into custody at which time police found what appeared to be a bag of cocaine in his back pocket.

See also
 Washington Huskies football statistical leaders

References

1983 births
Living people
People from Lakewood, Washington
Players of American football from Washington (state)
All-American college football players
American football wide receivers
Washington Huskies football players
Jacksonville Jaguars players
Seattle Seahawks players
Sacramento Mountain Lions players